This page list topics related to San Marino.



0-9

A
Abortion in San Marino
Apennine Mountains
Associazione Guide Esploratori Cattolici Sammarinesi
Ausa River
Azienda Autonoma di Stato per i Servizi Pubblici

B
Antonello Bacciocchi
Banca di San Marino
Birds of San Marino

C
Capital punishment in San Marino
Captains Regent
Carcere dei Cappuccini
Cassa di Risparmio della Repubblica di San Marino
Catholic Church in San Marino
Chiesa di San Paolo apostolo
Chiesa di San Pietro (San Marino)
Chiesa di Sant'Andrea (Acquaviva)
Chiesa di Sant'Andrea (Serravalle)
City of San Marino
Civic 10
Civil Police
Coat of arms of San Marino
Codice di avviamento postale
Commemorative coins of San Marino
Communications in San Marino
Communist Youth Federation of San Marino
Complice
Congress of State
Constitution of San Marino
Crisalide (Vola)

D
Demographics of San Marino
Diplomatic missions in San Marino
Diplomatic missions of San Marino

E
Economy of San Marino
Elections in San Marino
Extreme points of San Marino

F
Fiumicello (river)
Foreign relations of San Marino
Funivia di San Marino

G
Geography of San Marino
Grand and General Council
Guardia di Rocca
Government of San Marino

H
Healthcare in San Marino
History of San Marino

I
Ideas in Motion
Inno Nazionale della Repubblica

J
Judiciary of San Marino

K

L
Languages of San Marino
Law enforcement in San Marino
LGBT history in San Marino
LGBT rights in San Marino

M
Mammals of San Marino
Maybe (Forse)
Military of San Marino
Monastero di Santa Chiara
Monte Titano
Museo delle Cere (San Marino)
Music of San Marino

N

O
Oratorio di San Rocco (Cailungo)
Order of Saint Agatha
Order of San Marino

P
Palazzo Pubblico
Piazza della Libertà, San Marino
Political parties
Politics of San Marino
Population of San Marino
Postage stamps and postal history of San Marino
Poste San Marino
Protected areas of San Marino

Q

R
RETE Movement
Rimini

S
Sammarinese
Sammarinese euro coins
Sammarinese lira
Sammarinese Museum of Ancient Arms
Sammarinese wine
Scuola Superiore di Studi Storici di San Marino
S.P. Tre Penne
S.S. Murata
Saint Marinus
San Marino Grand Prix
San Marino Highway
San Marino RTV
Say Na Na Na
Sport in San Marino

T
Teatro Titano
Telecom Italia San Marino
Telecommunications in San Marino
Telephone numbers in San Marino
The Three Towers of San Marino
Torta Tre Monti
Tourism in San Marino
Transport in San Marino

U
Unitary Socialist Party–Socialist Agreement
University of the Republic of San Marino

V
 Vehicle registration plates of San Marino
 Visa requirements for Sammarinese citizens

W

X

Y

Z

Lists
Extreme points of San Marino
List of banks in San Marino
List of birds of San Marino
List of Captains Regent of San Marino
List of cities in San Marino
List of flag bearers for San Marino at the Olympics
List of fossiliferous stratigraphic units in San Marino
List of mammals of San Marino
List of museums in San Marino
List of newspapers in San Marino
List of political parties in San Marino
List of shopping malls in San Marino
List of supermarket chains in San Marino
List of universities in San Marino
List of years in San Marino
Municipalities of San Marino
San Marino national football team results

See also
Lists of country-related topics - similar lists for other countries

San Marino